Baeckea staminosa is a species of flowering plant in the family Myrtaceae and is endemic to the south-west of Western Australia.

The species was first formally described in 1904 by Ernst Georg Pritzel in Botanische Jahrbücher für Systematik, Pflanzengeschichte und Pflanzengeographie from specimens collected near the Greenough River. The specific epithet (staminosa) means "abounding in stamens".

Baeckea staminosa is classified as "Priority One" by the Government of Western Australia Department of Biodiversity, Conservation and Attractions, meaning that it is known from only one or a few locations which are potentially at risk.

See also
List of Baeckea species

References

Flora of Western Australia
staminosa
Plants described in 1904
Taxa named by Ernst Pritzel